Levi Richard Ellert (October 20, 1857 – July 21, 1901) was an American politician. He served as 23rd Mayor of San Francisco, serving from 1893 to 1895.

Biography 
Before entering politics, he had established his own pharmacy in 1883.  After unsuccessfully running for School Director, he was elected Supervisor as a Republican in 1888 and was reelected in 1890.  He was elected mayor in 1892, and during his term, he passed the bar exam and was admitted to the California bar.  He also "appeared before the Supreme Court."

He served as 23rd Mayor of San Francisco, serving from 1893 to 1895.  He was the first San Francisco native to serve in that office, no previous San Francisco mayors had even been born in California.

After his term, he would serve as director of various private companies and as general manager and the president of the Sanitary Reduction Works.

Death and legacy 
Ellert died in 1901 in San Francisco, and was buried at Cypress Lawn Memorial Park in Colma, California.

"Ellert Street" in the Bernal Heights neighborhood of San Francisco is named for him.

References

Sources
 Hanson, Gladys.  San Francisco Almanac.  San Francisco, CA:  Chronicle Books, 1995. 

1857 births
1901 deaths
Mayors of San Francisco
California Republicans
Burials at Cypress Lawn Memorial Park
American corporate directors